Howard Van Antwerp, Jr. (April 4, 1898 – June 26, 1992) was a college football player and attorney.

Centre College 
Van Antwerp was valedictorian of the class of 1920 at Centre College in Danville, Kentucky. He was also a prominent member of the football team, selected All-Southern at his guard position in 1919, a year in which Centre went undefeated.

References

External links 
 

1898 births
1992 deaths
Players of American football from Kentucky
American football guards
All-Southern college football players
People from Mount Sterling, Kentucky
People from Ashland, Kentucky
Centre Colonels football players